Marcus Hyman Bresslau (1807/8 – 14 May 1864) was a Prussian-born English Hebraist, editor, author, and journalist.

Biography
He was born to Gutel and Ḥayyim Bresslau in Breslau, Germany, and moved to London as a youth. He received a traditional Jewish education, and at some point became influenced by the ideas of the Haskalah. For a time he taught Hebrew at the Westminster Jews' Free School, and worked as baal keriah at the Western Synagogue, at which he occasionally delivered sermons.

He then became connected with the Hebrew Review, which ran under the editorship of Morris J. Raphall from 1834 to 1836. He became editor of the Jewish Chronicle in October 1844, when the periodical was revived by Joseph Mitchell. As editor, he advocated for popular education, for a more effective system of Jewish communal poor relief, and for certain changes to Orthodox liturgy and ritual. He resigned in October 1850 after disputes with Mitchell, but on the latter's suicide in June 1854, he re-assumed the editorship and became sole proprietor, though he sold it a few months afterward. Some years later he tried to revive the Hebrew Review, but failed, and he then retired from active work.

Bresslau was the author of a Hebrew grammar and dictionary. From the German he translated devotional exercises for women, and copied various Hebrew manuscripts in the collection at Oxford. He helped to translate into English the two volumes of "Miscellanea" from the Bodleian, edited by Hirsch Edelmann. Bresslau also publicly criticised the London Society for Promoting Christianity Among the Jews, and wrote of the denial of Jews' rights in England.

Bresslau declined numerous offers of employment within the Jewish community, and he lived his later years dependent on charity. A public subscription and testimonial were presented him during this time, in recognition of a thirty-year literary activity.

Partial bibliography

Notes

References
 

1800s births
1864 deaths
19th-century British Jews
19th-century English educators
English newspaper editors
English people of German-Jewish descent
German emigrants to England
Grammarians of Hebrew
Hebrew–English translators
Jewish lexicographers
Journalists from London
Journalists from Wrocław
Writers from Wrocław
19th-century lexicographers